Stijn Neirynck (born 14 September 1985 in Tielt) is a Belgian former cyclist.

Major results

2006
 3rd Paris–Tours Espoirs
2007
 3rd Internationale Wielertrofee Jong Maar Moedig
2008
 1st Internationale Wielertrofee Jong Maar Moedig
 8th Antwerpse Havenpijl
2011
 10th Handzame Classic
2012
 2nd Grote Prijs Jef Scherens
 5th Ronde van Drenthe
 6th Paris–Camembert
 10th Overall Eurométropole Tour

References

1985 births
Living people
Belgian male cyclists
People from Tielt
Sportspeople from West Flanders